Elections to Three Rivers District Council took place on 6 May 2021 alongside other local elections in the United Kingdom. 13 of the 39 seats were elected: the seats elected were last contested in the 2016 election. The election was originally scheduled to take place on 7 May 2020, however elections were delayed nationwide by one year due to the COVID-19 pandemic.

The Liberal Democrats held control of the council.

Results summary

Results by ward

Abbots Langley and Bedmond

Carpenders Park

Chorleywood North and Sarratt

Chorleywood South and Maple Cross

Dickinsons

Durrants

Gade Valley

Leavesden

Moor Park and Eastbury

Oxhey Hall and Hayling

Penn and Mill End

Rickmansworth Town

South Oxhey

References

Three Rivers District Council elections
Three Rivers
2020s in Hertfordshire